Chris McMenamin (born 2 January 1989 in Glasgow) is a Scottish footballer.

After spending much of last season on loan with Berwick while an Airdrie United player, defender Chris has now joined Berwick on a permanent basis. During his loan stint Chris, who made just a handful of first team appearances while at Airdrie United, made 24 appearances for Berwick last season and scored three times. Won SFL Young Player of Month during last season.

January 2010, Berwick Rangers have loaned former Airdrie youngster Chris McMenamin to junior side Linlithgow Rose

External links

1989 births
Living people
Footballers from Glasgow
Scottish footballers
Association football defenders
Airdrieonians F.C. players
Berwick Rangers F.C. players
Scottish Football League players
Linlithgow Rose F.C. players
Association football midfielders
Scottish Junior Football Association players